Logan School House is a historic one-room school building located at Kitts Hummock, Kent County, Delaware.  It was built about 1868, and is a one-story, gable roofed frame structure with grey simulated brick composition siding.  The interior has a plastered barrel vault ceiling. The school served the educational requirements of the agricultural community of lower St. Jones Neck School District.  Sometime after 1920 the building ceased to function as a school and it was converted into a private dwelling.

It was listed on the National Register of Historic Places in 1979.

References

One-room schoolhouses in Delaware
School buildings on the National Register of Historic Places in Delaware
School buildings completed in 1868
Schools in Kent County, Delaware
National Register of Historic Places in Kent County, Delaware